The Academic Word List (AWL) is a word list of 570 English words which appear with great frequency in a broad range of academic texts. The target readership is English as a second or foreign language students intending to enter English-medium higher education, and teachers of such students. The AWL was developed by Averil Coxhead at the School of Linguistics and Applied Language Studies at Victoria University of Wellington, New Zealand, and divided into ten sublists in decreasing order of frequency. The AWL excludes words from the General Service List (the 2000 highest-frequency words in general texts); however, many words in the AWL are general vocabulary rather than restricted to an academic domain, such as area, approach, create, similar, and occur in Sublist One.   

The list is available on the Simple English Wiktionary.

See also
General Service List

References 

 Coxhead, A. (2000). A New Academic Word List. TESOL Quarterly, Vol. 34, No. 2 (Summer, 2000), pp. 213-238 https://www.jstor.org/stable/3587951
 Hyland, K., & Tse, P. (June 2007). Is there an "Academic Vocabulary"? TESOL Quarterly, Volume 41, Number 2, pp. 235-253.
 Hancioglu, N., Neufeld, S., & Eldridge, J. (2008). Through the looking glass and into the land of lexico-grammar. English for Specific Purposes 27/4, 459-479

External links 
Academic Vocabulary
Vocabulary in EAP
Levels tests online

Lexis (linguistics)
Lists of English words